Ashokrao Shankarrao Chavan (born 28 October 1958) is an Indian politician from Maharashtra. He is a son of ex.Maharashtra Chief Minister Mr.Shankarraoji Chavan. He is one of the most influential leaders of Indian National Congress in Maharashtra. He has served as the Chief Minister of Maharashtra state from 8 December 2008 to 9 November 2010. Also, he has served as Minister for Cultural Affairs, Industries, Mines and Protocol in the Vilasrao Deshmukh government and he is also the former PWD Minister of Maharashtra.

On 9 November 2010, the Congress Party asked him to resign from office over corruption allegations relating to Adarsh Housing Society scam. In the 2014 general elections, despite the allegations and anti-incumbency wave, he won the Lok Sabha election from his Nanded constituency with a comfortable margin. In 2015, he was appointed the president of Maharashtra Pradesh Congress Committee. Chavan lost his Nanded seat in the 2019 Lok sabha election to Pratap Patil Chikhalikar of the BJP.

Chavan belongs to an influential political family based in Nanded district of Maharashtra state. He is the son of Shankarrao Chavan, a former Chief Minister of Maharashtra himself; they are the first father–son duo in the state's history to become chief ministers. His brother-in-law Bhaskarrao Bapurao Khatgaonkar Patil was a three-time Member of Legislative Assembly (MLA) and a three-time MP, and Chavan's wife, Amita is MLA from Bhokar constituency in Nanded for years 2014-19.

Personal life 
Chavan did his schooling at the St. Xavier's High School, Fort. He graduated in Science and has obtained his Master's in Business Management from Hazarimal Jomani College and B.Y.K. College of Commerce.

Chavan belongs to a political dynasty that includes his father and wife.
Chavan's father, Shankarrao Chavan had a long career as a minister and was twice, the Chief Minister of Maharashtra. He had also served as a senior minister in the national government under various Congress governments. Ashok Chavan is married to Ameeta (née Sharma). Ameeta is current member of Maharashtra Legislative Assembly from Bhokar constituency which has previously been represented by both Shankarrao Chavan and Chavan himself. The couple has twin daughters Srijaya and Sujaya.

Political career

Organisational
He started career as student leader of University of Pune occupying post of University Representative (UR).

He started his political career in Congress Party as General Secretary, Maharashtra Pradesh Congress Committee from 1995 to 1999.

President: Maharashtra Pradesh Congress Committee from 2014 to 2019.

Electoral politics
In 1987–89, he held post of Member of Parliament from Nanded Lok Sabha constituency.

In 1992, he was elected as M.L.C. to the Maharashtra Legislative Council and later joined as Minister of State for Public works, Urban Development and Home in March 1993.

In 2003, Vilasrao Deshmukh appointed Chavan as Minister for Transport, Ports, Cultural Affairs and Protocol.

In November 2004, he was given the portfolio of Industries, Mining, Cultural Affairs & Protocol in Maharashtra cabinet.

As a cabinet minister 
 2003: Transport Minister.
 2019: Sworn in as Cabinet Minister in Uddhav Thackeray's Ministry.

Tenure as Chief Minister of Maharashtra
 
In the aftermath of the November 2008 Mumbai attacks, Vilasrao Deshmukh took the moral responsibility and offered to resign, which was then accepted by the party and Chavan was elected as Chief Minister of Maharashtra.

After winning assembly elections in 2009, Congress President Sonia Gandhi once again nominated  Chavan as the  Chief Minister of Maharashtra. Sharad Pawar, the leader of rival coalition partner NCP party, had been lukewarm towards Chavan, after his first choice of union power minister Sushil Kumar Shinde was ignored well before the race began.

Congress had clearly plumped for a Maratha to lead the party in the state, and had ignored the NCP view that  a non-Maratha should be selected for the position  to set right the social combination.

As a result, NCP chose a non-Maratha, Chhagan Bhujbal to occupy the deputy Chief Minister's post and gave the home ministry to Jayant Patil. The latter being a Maratha balanced the NCP's own bid to remain the community's first choice.
Chavan was asked to resign as Chief Minister during a meeting with Congress president, Sonia Gandhi, after it emerged that three of his relatives owned apartments in the  Adarsh Housing Society which was created specifically to house Indian war veterans  in the upmarket Colaba area of Mumbai. He was succeeded by Prithviraj Chavan.

Post Chief Minister 
Despite the corruption allegations, the Congress party put him up as a party candidate for the 2014 Lok Sabha Elections. He won the election by a huge margin. In Maharashtra, Rajiv Satav and Chavan  were the only  Congress candidates elected.

In 2015, he took over as the chief of the Maharashtra Pradesh Congress Committee.

Chavan contested the 2019 Lok Sabha Elections from Nanded Constituency but  lost the election to BJP's Prataprao Patil Chikhalikar. He is one of the 9 former Chief Ministers of Congress who lost in Lok Sabha 2019 Election.

Controversy, scams and allegations
Apart from the much discussed Adarsh Housing Society Scam, Chavan was accused of using his office to fund his relatives' bank.
Recently High court of Maharashtra state denied permission to the  agency investigating the Adarsh scam to question Chavan. 

In 2009 Assembly Elections, he was accused of hiding expenses on a paid supplement titled Ashok Parva in a leading Marathi daily. However,  he denied the allegation by the Election Commission of India of having inserted favourable Paid News in newspapers.

Legislative assembly election's record

References

External links
 Biodata
 Official Website - Ashok Chavan
 Biodata On Ourneta.com

1958 births
Living people
People from Nanded
Chief Ministers of Maharashtra
Indian National Congress politicians from Maharashtra
India MPs 1984–1989
Marathi politicians
Maharashtra MLAs 2009–2014
Lok Sabha members from Maharashtra
India MPs 2014–2019
Chief ministers from Indian National Congress
People from Marathwada
Corruption in Maharashtra